The 1925 Chatham Cup was the third annual nationwide knockout football competition in New Zealand.

The competition was run on a regional basis. Each region held its own contest to find a regional champion, with these then being grouped into four regional associations (Auckland, Wellington, Canterbury, and Otago), each of which was represented in semi-finals by one team, followed by northern and southern semi-finals and a national final.

Entrants
In all, 30 teams took part in the competition, though some contemporary reports say there were 29. Ten of these teams were from the Wellington area, nine from Auckland, and three from Christchurch. Confusion is caused by some contemporary reports which list the Pukemiro team as "Huntly", despite these being two separate sides from the same area.

Auckland
Auckland Harbour Board (Watersiders)
Auckland Thistle
Auckland YMCA
Hellabys
Northcote
North Shore
Ponsonby
Royal Navy
Tramways
South Auckland (Waikato)
Frankton Railways (Hamilton)
Huntly
Pukemiro (Huntly)
Rotowaro (Huntly)

Hawke's Bay
Hastings United
Manawatu
Palmerston North RSA
Wellington
Brooklyn
Diamond
Hospital (Porirua)
Johnsonville
Scottish Wanderers
Waterside
Wellington Institute
Wellington Marist
Wellington Thistle
Wellington YMCA

Canterbury
Nomads (Christchurch)
Rangers (Christchurch)
Sunnyside
North Otago
Oamaru Rangers
Otago
Seacliff

The 1925 final
The final was played at Newtown Park, Wellington, a change of venue from the previous finals which had been at Athletic Park. This new venue was to host the final again in 1927, with the Basin Reserve being preferred as a permanent venue from 1928 after its use in 1926. The 1925 final was part of an unusual double-bill, the ground also being used on the same day for a rugby league match between the New Zealand team and a touring Queensland representative XIII.

The final was the first re-match of two teams who had previously contested a final; six Seacliff players and four YWCA players played in both the 1923 and 1925 finals. The game was described in The Dominion as entertaining with a number of chances, as was reflected by the scoreline, which was 2-2 at full time. The first goal came from Stewart Dempster for YMCA, but Wattie Hanlin equalised before the half-time interval. In the second half Seacliff went into the lead through Bill Hooper, who became the first player to score in two separate finals, having previously scored in Seacliff's 1923 win. this time it was YMCA who equalised with a second goal from Dempster. Dave Halley grabbed the winner for the Wellington side early in the first period of extra time.

Results

First round

Second round

Third round

Fourth round

See note below quarter-finals.

Quarter-finals

The fourth quarter-final would have been between Nomads and either Rangers or Sunnyside. Two of these three teams would have previously met in the fourth round.

Semi-finals ("Island finals")

Final
Teams

Wellington Y.M.C.A: Albert Bentley, Horrie Prince, Les McGirr, W. Pearson, Neil MacArthur, Charlie Trott, Billy Nichols, Stewart Dempster, Dave Holly (or Halley), Charles Ballard, George Campbell.

Seacliff: R. Gwilliam, George Anderson, Bill Rogers, Alex Waugh, Wattie Cooper, Bill Murray, D. Milne, Malcolm Macdougall, Bill Hooper, Wattie Hanlin, J. Baillie.

References

Rec.Sport.Soccer Statistics Foundation New Zealand 1925 page

Chatham Cup
Chatham Cup
Chatham Cup